Glochidion johnstonei is a species of plant in the family Phyllanthaceae. It is endemic to India.

References

Flora of India (region)
johnstonei
Vulnerable plants
Taxonomy articles created by Polbot
Taxa named by Joseph Dalton Hooker